Retail Week is a London-based news website, data service, events producer and magazine covering the retail industry, primarily in the United Kingdom.

History and profile
Founded in 1988 by financial journalist Patience Wheatcroft and her husband Tony Salter, Retail Week is now owned by the business information and events company William Reed.

Subscribers are primarily retail company board directors and senior managers, as well as suppliers to retailers and investment analysts.

Retail Week launched its website, Retail-week.com, in 2004. The site was redesigned and relaunched in 2007 and most recently in 2021. Retail-week.com has 192,000 monthly users.

Charlotte Hardie has been editor-in-chief of Retail Week since January 2023. The previous editors were Tim Danaher, Patience Wheatcroft (1988–1992), Ian McGarrigle (1992–1996), Kate Oppenheim (1996–1999), Neill Denny (1999–2004), Chris Brook-Carter (2004-2020) and Luke Tugy (2020-2022).  

Retail Week runs an annual conference in London called Retail Week Live for leaders of the retail industry and hosts the annual Retail Week Awards.

References

External links
 Retail Week website
  Retail Week Live website

1988 establishments in the United Kingdom
Ascential
Business magazines published in the United Kingdom
News magazines published in the United Kingdom
Weekly magazines published in the United Kingdom
Magazines established in 1988
Professional and trade magazines
Retailing in the United Kingdom
Magazines published in London